Amar y temer is a 2011 Colombian telenovela produced and broadcast by Caracol TV and Sony Pictures Entertainment.

Cast
 Diana Hoyos as Alicia
 Salvador del Solar as Simón "el destructor" Oviedo
 Nicolás Montero as Pascual
 Salvatore Cassandro as Duarte

External links
 Official site (in Spanish)

2011 telenovelas
2011 Colombian television series debuts
2011 Colombian television series endings
Colombian telenovelas
Caracol Televisión telenovelas
Spanish-language telenovelas
Television shows set in Bogotá
Sony Pictures Television telenovelas